George Edmund Baldred Baillie-Hamilton, 14th Earl of Haddington (born 27 December 1985), is a British peer and landowner.

The son of John Baillie-Hamilton, 13th Earl of Haddington, he was educated at Belhaven Hill School, Eton College, and the University of Glasgow, where he gained a degree in arts and media informatics. After that, he migrated to London and worked as a freelance writer, including for Mary Kellor, the agony aunt at The Spectator and a star of Gogglebox with her husband Giles Wood.

When his father died, in 2016, he inherited his peerages and the Mellerstain House estate and decided to go home to Scotland to take charge of the historic house.

Haddington married Constanza Dessain, daughter of Simon James Francis Dessain, of Inverkeilor, Arbroath in 2021.

References 

Living people
1985 births
Alumni of the University of Glasgow
14
People educated at Eton College
People educated at Belhaven Hill School